Puente Nacional may refer to:

 Puente Nacional, Santander, municipality of Colombia
 Puente Nacional, Veracruz, municipality of Mexico